Francis Granger Quigley,  (10 July 1894 – 20 October 1918) was a Canadian aviator and flying ace of the First World War, who was credited with 33 aerial victories. He was notable for scoring the majority of his victories against German fighter planes.

Early life and service
Quigley was born in Toronto, Canada, on 10 July 1894, the youngest son of Robert John Quigley and Anne Jane Primrose. He attended St. Andrew's College in Aurora, Ontario, and was attending his second year at Queen's University in Kingston when the First World War broke out. He excelled at the sports of football and hockey.

First World War
Quigley enlisted in the Canadian Expeditionary Force on 16 December 1914, and served with the 5th Field Company of the Canadian Army Engineers on the Western Front. In early 1917, he transferred to the Royal Flying Corps (RFC). On 12 September 1917, he was assigned to No. 70 Squadron RFC, flying the Sopwith Camel.

Service as a fighter pilot
In less than a month, on 10 October, Quigley scored his first victory by shooting down an Albatros D.V in flames, and driving another down out of control. They were the first of 21 victories he scored against the Albatros D.V. Quigley had three victories in October, one in November, and five in December. In recognition of these exploits, Quigley was awarded the Military Cross in February 1918. The citation for the award was published in a supplement to the London Gazette, reading:

In 1918, Quigley scored eight times in January. On 6 January, he, William Fry, and P. G. Kemsley teamed up to shoot down and kill Leutnant Walter von Bülow-Bothkamp, himself an ace with 28 victories. Quigley triumphed once again in February, then 15 times between 8 and 23 March 1918. On 11 March alone, he helped destroy the only observation balloon of his career in the morning, then in the afternoon destroyed a Pfalz D.III and drove two others down out of control. For his work during this time Quigley was awarded a Bar to his Military Cross, the award citation reading:

Quigley victory tally comprised 16 enemy fighter planes destroyed and ten others driven down out of control, four observation planes destroyed and two driven down out of control, as well as an observation balloon destroyed. Quigley was the antithesis of the lone wolf pilot, sharing victories not just with Fry and Kemsley, but with such other aces as Frank Gorringe, George R. Howsam, John Todd, Frank Hobson, Alfred Michael Koch, and Walter M. Carlaw.

Instructional appointments and death

Quigley was wounded in action on 27 March 1918 and recovered in Le Touquet Hospital. He was returned to Canada to finish his recuperation from his shattered ankle. He served as an instructor at Armour Heights while he was in Canada. In June the London Gazette announced the award of the Distinguished Service Order to Quigley, the citation reading:

After his convalescence, Quigley requested a return to action in France. While returning to England in October 1918, Quigley came down with influenza and died in a hospital in Liverpool two days after his ship docked. He is buried at Mount Pleasant Cemetery in Toronto, Ontario.

References

Bibliography
 Above the Trenches: A Complete Record of the Fighter Aces and Units of the British Empire Air Forces 1915–1920 Christopher F. Shores, Norman L. R. Franks, Russell Guest. Grub Street, 1990. , .

Canadian aviators
Canadian World War I flying aces
Canadian Companions of the Distinguished Service Order
Royal Flying Corps officers
British Army personnel of World War I
Deaths from the Spanish flu pandemic in England
1894 births
1918 deaths
Canadian recipients of the Military Cross